Waltz for Monica is a Swedish biographical drama film directed by Per Fly. It is based on the life and career of the singer and actress Monica Zetterlund, portrayed by Edda Magnason. The film was released theatrically in Sweden on 13 September 2013.

Plot
Monica makes it from a telephone operator to a national celebrity. But fame and party life take their toll.

Cast
 Edda Magnason as Monica Zetterlund
 Sverrir Gudnason as Sture Åkerberg
 Kjell Bergqvist as Monica's father
 Cecilia Ljung as Monica's mother
 Vera Vitali as Marika
 Johannes Wanselow as Beppe Wolgers
 Oskar Thunberg as Vilgot Sjöman
 Randal D. Ingram as Bill Evans
 Rob Morgan as Miles Davis
 Amelia Fowler as Ella Fitzgerald
 Clinton Ingram as Tommy Flanagan
 Harry Friedländer as Hasse Alfredson
 Andréa Ager-Hanssen as Lena Nyman

Reception
Waltz for Monica received generally positive reviews. In Sweden, Kulturnyheterna on SVT gave it a 4 out of 5 and especially praised Magnason's performance. Svenska Dagbladet also praised Magnason's performance, giving the film a 4 out of 6. MovieZine also liked the film, giving it 4 out of 5. Many newspapers gave the film with a 4 out of 5, among them Aftonbladet, Expressen, Göteborgs-Posten and Metro. However, the film was criticized by the documentary filmmaker Tom Alandh, who wrote an article in the newspaper Dagens Nyheter where he objected to the film's negative portrayal of Zetterlund's father.

Waltz for Monica received 11 Guldbagge Award nominations.

Soundtrack
A soundtrack album of the film was released by Universal Music, charting in various Scandinavian charts, notably Sweden, Finland and Denmark.

Track listing
"Sakta vi gå genom stan"
"Hit The Road Jack"
"Monica's vals"
"O vad en liten gumma kan gno"
"En gång i Stockholm"
"It Could Happen to You"
"Gröna små äpplen"
"Trubbel"
"Du"
"Bedårande sommarvals"
"I Can't Give You Anything But Love"
"I New York"
"Monica Z – Svit ur filmen"

Charts

References

External links
 
 
 

2013 films
2013 drama films
2013 biographical drama films
2010s Swedish-language films
Biographical films about singers
Cultural depictions of jazz musicians
Cultural depictions of Swedish women
Drama films based on actual events
Films directed by Per Fly
Films set in the 1960s
Films set in Stockholm
Films shot in Gothenburg
Films shot in New York City
Films shot in Stockholm
Films shot in Trollhättan
Films whose director won the Best Director Guldbagge Award
Jazz films
Swedish biographical drama films
2010s Swedish films